Seán Keegan (2 February 1930 – 9 July 2007) was an Irish Fianna Fáil politician. A farmer from Kilbeggan, his father had been active in the Irish War of Independence.

Career
He was elected to Westmeath County Council in 1955. He contested his first general election in 1965 at the behest of Seán Lemass. Keegan was first elected to the 12th Seanad in 1970 at a by-election to the Administrative Panel. He was re-elected to the Seanad in 1973, having been an unsuccessful candidate at the 1973 general election. At the 1977 general election, he was elected to the Dáil as a Fianna Fáil Teachta Dála (TD) for the Longford–Westmeath constituency, with his surplus votes helping to elect Albert Reynolds, also for the first time. He was re-elected twice, at the 1981 and the February 1982 general elections. He lost his seat at the November 1982 general election.

References

1930 births
2007 deaths
Fianna Fáil TDs
Members of the 12th Seanad
Members of the 13th Seanad
Members of the 21st Dáil
Members of the 22nd Dáil
Members of the 23rd Dáil
Irish farmers
Local councillors in County Westmeath
Fianna Fáil senators